Colleen Madden is an American illustrator and author known for her works in children's literature. She illustrated Mariah Carey's 2015 children's book All I Want for Christmas Is You based on Carey's song by the same name and the best selling series What If Everybody Did That with Amazon and Two Lions Publishing. Colleen is currently working on her next projects as author/illustrator including a new graphic novel series with Top Shelf Comics, entitled Shelley Frankenstein, Book 1 CowPiggy, launching Halloween 2022.

Early life
Madden is one of eight siblings.

Education

Madden is a Second City-trained actress. She also attended a Massachusetts liberal arts college where she earned her degrees in illustration and English literature.

Personal life
Madden lives and works in the Philadelphia area with her husband and two sons.

Awards and nominations
Madden is the recipient of the International Greeting Card Louie Award.

Bibliography
 A Christmas Too Big (2021), author and illustrator
What If Everybody Did That?  SERIES (2019), illustrator
 The Kiddie Table (2018), author and illustrator
 Monkey Walk (2018), author and illustrator
Happy Birthday to You! (2017), illustrator
 The 12 Days of Valentine's (2017), illustrator
 Coasting Casey: A Tale of Busting Boredom in School (2016), illustrator
 All I Want for Christmas Is You (2015), illustrator
 Henry Hodges Needs A Friend (2015), illustrator
 Multicultural Fairy Tales (2014), illustrator
 The Crazy Case of Missing Thunder (2012), illustrator
Diva Duck Travels the World (2012), illustrator
Diva Duck Dreams (2012), illustrator
Diva Duck Goes to Hollywood (2012), illustrator
School Rules for Diva Duck (2012), illustrator
 Happy Sparkling Hanukkah (2011), illustrator
 What If a Stranger Approaches You? (2011), illustrator
Secret Sparkling Valentine (2011), illustrator
Easter Sparkling Surprise (2011), illustrator
Happy Sparkling Halloween (2010), illustrator
Merry Sparkling Christmas (2010), illustrator

References

American children's book illustrators
Living people
Year of birth missing (living people)